What Men Talk About. Continuation is a 2018 Russian comedy film directed by Flyuza Farkhshatova.

Plot 
This time Lesha, Slava, Camille and Sasha go to St. Petersburg, and not all of them know why they are going there, but then they understand that it doesn't matter. The main thing is that they may not think for some time about the unresolved problems left at home. A lot of exciting adventures await the characters along the way.

Cast 
 Leonid Barats as Lyosha
 Aleksandr Demidov as Sasha
 Rostislav Khait as Slava
 Kamil Larin as Kamil
 Mikhail Prokhorov

References

External links 
 

2018 films
2010s Russian-language films
Russian comedy films
2018 comedy films